St. Joseph Central High School may refer to:

Central High School (St. Joseph, Missouri)
St. Joseph Central Catholic High School in Huntington, West Virginia
St. Joseph Central High School (Pittsfield, Massachusetts)
Saint Joseph Central Catholic High School (Fremont, Ohio)
Saint Joseph Central High School (Ironton, Ohio)